"I Love the Nightlife (Disco 'Round)" is a popular disco song recorded by American singer Alicia Bridges in 1978. It went to number two on the US Billboard National Disco Action Top 30 (now the Dance Club Songs chart) for two weeks. It became a crossover hit, peaking at number five on the Billboard Hot 100, and found worldwide success, reaching the top 10 in Australia, Belgium, Canada, the Netherlands and South Africa, as well as making the reaching the top 30 in the UK. A re-release in 1994 allowed the song to reach number four in New Zealand and number five in Iceland.

Background
The song was co-written by Alicia Bridges and Susan Hutcheson in 1977 for Bill Lowery, founder of Southern Music. "I Love the Nightlife" was the first single produced by Steve Buckingham who was invited to produce the single's parent album entitled Alicia Bridges after he had played guitar on a session by the singer. Bridges suggested to Hutcheson that they write a song with either "disco" or "boogie" in the title after Bridges saw a current top-ten hit list featuring several songs with dance-oriented titles. The original title of the resultant song: "Disco 'Round", became the subtitle under the main title "I Love the Nightlife" as Buckingham considered it an R&B number and did not want it labeled disco. Bridges herself would later admit that she had hopes that the song would be received as a Memphis soul number, calling it "something Al Green might sing". However it is as a disco classic that the song is most remembered: in an August 26, 1998 MTV countdown of the Top 54 Dance Songs of the Disco Era, "I Love the Nightlife" was ranked at number 37.

1994 re-release
In 1994, the song gained renewed interest after being featured in the film The Adventures of Priscilla, Queen of the Desert. It was subsequently re-released and found the best success in New Zealand, where it reached number four in February 1995, 12 places higher than its original peak of number 16. The re-release also reached number five in Iceland and number 11 in Australia. Because of its association with the film (and also because Bridges herself is an open lesbian), the song is closely linked with gay culture. It was remixed for this release.

Music video

A music video was directed by Bruce Gowers.

1994 video
In 1994, a new video was produced featuring Hugo Weaving, star of the film The Adventures of Priscilla, Queen of the Desert.

Charts and certifications

Weekly charts

Year-end charts

Certifications

Cover versions
 Laura Branigan sang the song live on German television and it was included on the very rare compilation album Gut Gestimmt in 1980. 
 In 1995 the song was released by the band Bronski Beat labeled "I Luv The Nightlife", which featured two remix versions of the original song and two remix versions of the alternate song Hit That Perfect Beat Boy.
 It was re-recorded by Latin singer La India and Nuyorican Soul as a track on the soundtrack for the film The Last Days of Disco. This version peaked at number 12 on the Billboard Hot Dance Club Songs chart.
 In 2003 it was performed by Taylor Dayne in the television special The Disco Ball.

In popular culture
In The Simpsons episode "Homer's Phobia", Homer dances to the song. In another episode, "I'm with Cupid", Apu taught a parrot to sing "I Love The Nightlife" with clever new lyrics to Manjula. Marge was impressed although she hates the song; Homer admits that he hates it as well. It was also featured in the episode "A Milhouse Divided", with Luann Van Houten humming it while burning Kirk's storage boxes. It also can be heard in the 2008 episode "Mypods and Boomsticks" in Studio 54 when Itchy travels back to Studio 54 in the "Itchy & Scratchy" short.
In the 1979 horror-comedy film Love At First Bite, the vampire Dracula and his would-be bride dance to the song in a disco. The 2007 DVD release of the movie features a different song in the relevant scene, however the 2015 release by Shout! Factory restored the original song.
 In the movie So I Married An Axe Murderer, Mike Myers's character quotes the lyrics from the chorus during a conversation with his love interest in the movie.
 In the Jeopardy! round of the May 29, 2006 episode of Jeopardy!, the last two categories were "I Love the Nightlife" (about cities at night) and "I Got to Boogie" (about famous escapees).
 Featured in the film The Adventures of Priscilla, Queen of the Desert (1994), and stage musical, Priscilla Queen of the Desert – the Musical
 Featured in the short documentary film "Ladies Please!" (1995)
 Thai 1995 MC Jeans ad show two men in different car calling and hear the cassette tape in a car when they go to the hotel.
 Lyrics used in the March 29, 2012 episode of The Big Bang Theory as a "test" that the character of Raj Koothrappali could be gay.
 The song was featured in the seventh season of It's Always Sunny In Philadelphia episode “Frank’s Brother” during the scene where Frank returns from Colombia.
 The song was in the May 15, 2019 episode "Five, Six, Seven, Ate!" (episode 3 of Season 5) of iZombie during the montage scene in which Liv and Clive teach Ravi to dance.
 The song was featured in a 2021 Gucci commercial.

See also
List of 1970s one-hit wonders in the United States

References

External links
 Lyrics of this song
 

1978 singles
1978 songs
Alicia Bridges songs
Music videos directed by Bruce Gowers
Song recordings produced by Steve Buckingham (record producer)
Polydor Records singles